Austin Jarriel Jackson (born February 1, 1987) is an American former professional baseball center fielder. He played in Major League Baseball (MLB) for the Detroit Tigers, Seattle Mariners, Chicago Cubs, Chicago White Sox, Cleveland Indians, San Francisco Giants and New York Mets. Prior to playing professionally, he attended Billy Ryan High School.

Jackson was drafted by the New York Yankees in the 2005 Major League Baseball draft. He was traded to the Tigers at the end of the 2009 season, where he made his MLB debut in 2010, being nominated for American League Rookie of the Year that season. The next two seasons, he made the postseason on both occasions with the Tigers. During those seasons, he led the American League in hitting triples, and won the Fielding Bible Award for center field in 2011.

Early years
In 1999, Baseball America named Jackson the best 12-year-old baseball player in the nation, and the best 15-year-old baseball player three years later.

Jackson attended Billy Ryan High School in Denton, Texas.

In basketball, he was listed as the #10-ranked high school point guard in the country by Athlon Sports after he averaged 22.5 points, five rebounds and three assists per game his junior year in high school. In baseball, he hit .423 with five homers and 34 RBI for his class AAAA Texas State runner-up baseball team and was rated the No. 14 draft prospect among high school players in the nation by Baseball America.

Professional career

New York Yankees
Though Jackson committed to play both baseball and basketball for Georgia Tech, the New York Yankees drafted him in the eighth round (259th overall) in the 2005 Major League Baseball draft. To convince him to sign instead of attending Georgia Tech, the Yankees offered Jackson $800,000, a record signing bonus for an eighth round pick.

From 2005 to 2009 Jackson rose up the Yankees organization and after a slow start, he became a top prospect for the Yankees. For the 2009 season he was the Yankees top prospect according to Baseball America.

After the 2009 season, Jackson was added to the 40-man roster to protect him from the Rule 5 draft.

Detroit Tigers
On December 9, 2009 Jackson was traded to the Detroit Tigers as part of a three-team trade that brought Curtis Granderson to the Yankees. Jackson entered the 2010 season as the Tigers third-best prospect, according to Baseball America.

Jackson made his major league debut on April 5, 2010, against the Kansas City Royals, going one for five. He hit his first major league home run on April 25, 2010, off of Colby Lewis of the Texas Rangers. Through the first month of the season Jackson led the majors in hits with 36, and was named the AL Rookie of the Month. On June 2, 2010, against the Cleveland Indians, Jackson made a difficult running catch in the ninth inning of Armando Galarraga's near-perfect game. The perfect game eventually ended with two outs in the ninth after a blown call by umpire Jim Joyce. He was named an outfielder on Baseball America's 2010 All-Rookie Team. He was also named an outfielder on the 2010 Topps Major League Rookie All-Star Team.

On November 15, 2010, Jackson came in second in the 2010 American League Rookie of the Year voting, behind Rangers closer Neftalí Feliz. Jackson finished his rookie season by playing 151 games with a .293 batting average, 10 triples, 4 home runs, 41 RBI, and an AL-leading 170 strikeouts.

Jackson was named the American League Player of the Week for the week of August 29–September 4, 2011.  In receiving the award for the first time, Jackson had a .529 batting average (18 for 34) during the week with three doubles, three triples, two home runs, five runs batted in, and 13 runs scored.  The Tigers went 5–2 that week to increase their lead in the American League Central Division. He won a Fielding Bible Award in 2011 as the best fielding center fielder in MLB. Jackson played 153 games in 2011 batting .249 with 10 home runs, 45 RBI, an AL-leading 11 triples, and 181 strikeouts. In Game 6 of the 2011 ALCS, Jackson hit his first career postseason home run. The Tigers would however lose the game and the series to the Texas Rangers.

On April 5, 2012, Jackson was the leadoff hitter and played center field on Opening Day for the Tigers, where he went 3–5 with an RBI and a run. Jackson hit a walk-off, bases-loaded single down the third base line to give the Tigers the win over the Red Sox, 3–2. Jackson played 137 games in 2012, batting .300 with 16 home runs, 66 RBI, and an AL-leading 10 triples. Jackson went to the postseason with the Tigers for a second straight season, and he hit a home run in the series-clinching Game 4 against the New York Yankees in the ALCS. But the Tigers eventually got swept in 4 games by the San Francisco Giants in the World Series.

Injuries limited Jackson to 129 games in 2013.  Serving as the Tigers leadoff hitter again, he batted .272 with 12 home runs, 49 RBIs, and a career-low 8 stolen bases. On January 17, 2014, Jackson and the Tigers avoided arbitration by agreeing to a one-year deal for the 2014 season worth $6 million.

Seattle Mariners
On July 31, 2014, the Tigers traded Jackson to the Seattle Mariners in a three-team deal that sent Drew Smyly, Nick Franklin and Willy Adames to the Tampa Bay Rays, and David Price to the Detroit Tigers.

On May 3, 2015, Jackson sprained his ankle in a game against the Houston Astros, and was placed on the 15-day disabled list the following day.

Chicago Cubs
On August 31, 2015, the Mariners traded Jackson to the Chicago Cubs for a player to be named later and an international signing bonus slot.

Jackson ended the 2015 season having played 136 games, stealing 17 bases with a .696 OPS.

Chicago White Sox
On March 6, 2016, Jackson signed a one-year, $5 million deal with the Chicago White Sox. On August 25, White Sox GM Rick Hahn told the media that Jackson would miss the rest of the season after he had been out since June 10. He had surgery to repair a medial meniscus tear in his left knee. Over 54 games, he tallied a .254 batting average, 18 RBI, 12 doubles, and 24 runs scored.

Cleveland Indians
Jackson signed a minor league contract with the Cleveland Indians on January 25, 2017. The Indians purchased Jackson's contract on March 27, 2017. On August 1, 2017, Jackson robbed Hanley Ramirez of a home run by making a spectacular catch over the right center field wall. He traveled approximately 97 feet and flipped over the wall into the Red Sox bullpen. This was declared by broadcasters and MLB as the "play of the year" for 2017.

San Francisco Giants
On January 22, 2018, Jackson signed a two-year deal with the San Francisco Giants worth $6 million over two years.

Texas Rangers
On July 8, 2018, Jackson was traded to the Texas Rangers along with pitcher Cory Gearrin and minor league pitcher Jason Bahr, in exchange for a player to be named later or cash considerations. Three days later, he was designated for assignment by the Rangers. The Rangers released Jackson on July 14.

New York Mets
On July 27, Jackson signed with the New York Mets, as depth in center field, with Juan Lagares sidelined for the remainder of the season due to a toe injury and Yoenis Cespedes out for the remainder of the season to undergo multiple surgeries to eliminate calcification and bone spurs in both heels. He hit a walk-off on David Wright's final career game. He elected free agency on October 29, 2018.

Post-Career
In April 2020, Jackson expressed interest in an MLB return. As of September 2021, he had not signed with an MLB team.

Starting on July 7, 2021, Jackson announced the three game series between the Detroit Tigers and Texas Rangers game alongside Dan Dickerson on the Detroit Tigers Radio Network.

References

External links

1987 births
Living people
Sportspeople from Denton, Texas
Baseball players from Texas
African-American baseball players
Major League Baseball center fielders
Detroit Tigers players
Seattle Mariners players
Chicago Cubs players
Chicago White Sox players
Cleveland Indians players
San Francisco Giants players
New York Mets players
Gulf Coast Yankees players
Charleston RiverDogs players
Tampa Yankees players
Trenton Thunder players
Scranton/Wilkes-Barre Yankees players
Toledo Mud Hens players
Tacoma Rainiers players
Peoria Javelinas players
Honolulu Sharks players
21st-century African-American sportspeople
20th-century African-American people